Sir John Douglas Guise  (29 August 1914 – 7 February 1991) was a Papua New Guinean politician who served as the first governor-general of Papua New Guinea after the country's independence from Australia in 1975. Prior to the independence itself, Guise was a vocal advocate for a peaceful secession from Australia.

He was born in Gedulalara village, near Dogura, and was educated there at the mission school of a church in Milne Bay District. His grandfather was Reginald Guise, an English adventurer who reached Papua in the 1880s, settled as a trader and married locally.

He served in the Department of Native Affairs during the 1950s, and became the president of the Port Moresby Mixed Race Association in 1958. In the 1961 elections for the Legislative Council, he was elected in the Eastern Papua constituency. In 1964 he was elected to the new House of Assembly, and went on to serve as Speaker from 1968 to 1972.

Guise served as Governor-General of Papua New Guinea for two years. He resigned as Governor-General to contest the 1977 election against Michael Somare, where he was defeated. He remained politically active and considered as a potential leader during the civil unrest after his term in office. Guise died on 7 February 1991. After his death, a sports stadium was named in his honour.

He was appointed a Commander of the Order of the British Empire (CBE) in 1972, made a Knight Commander of the order (KBE) on 6 June 1975, and appointed a Knight Grand Cross of the Order of St Michael and St George (GCMG) on 16 September 1975.

References 

Notes

Citations

Bibliography 
 Lentz, Harris M., III. Heads of States and Governments. Jefferson, NC: McFarland & Company, 1994. .

1914 births
1991 deaths
Governors-General of Papua New Guinea
Members of the National Parliament of Papua New Guinea
Speakers of the National Parliament of Papua New Guinea
Knights Grand Cross of the Order of St Michael and St George
Knights Commander of the Order of the British Empire
Members of the Legislative Council of Papua and New Guinea
Members of the House of Assembly of Papua and New Guinea
Papua New Guinean people of English descent